The 2010 VCU Rams baseball team represented Virginia Commonwealth University during the 2010 NCAA Division I baseball season. The Rams played their home games at The Diamond as a member of the Colonial Athletic Association. They were led by head coach Paul Keyes, in his sixteenth year as head coach.

Previous season

The 2009 VCU Rams baseball team notched a 20–26 (8–16) regular-season record.

Schedule

References 

2010 Colonial Athletic Association baseball season
2010
2010 in sports in Virginia
Vcu
2010